Anahuac Independent School District is a public school district based in Anahuac, Texas (USA). The district serves Anahuac and several unincorporated areas, including Double Bayou, Hankamer, Monroe City, Oak Island, Smith Point, Turtle Bayou, and Wallisville. The district operates one high school, Anahuac High School.

Finances
As of the 2010-2011 school year, the appraised valuation of property in the district was $310,658,000. The maintenance tax rate was $0.104 and the bond tax rate was $0.032 per $100 of appraised valuation.

Academic achievement
In 2011, the school district was rated "recognized" by the Texas Education Agency.  Thirty-five percent of districts in Texas in 2011 received the same rating. No state accountability ratings will be given to districts in 2012. A school district in Texas can receive one of four possible rankings from the Texas Education Agency: Exemplary (the highest possible ranking), Recognized, Academically Acceptable, and Academically Unacceptable (the lowest possible ranking).

Historical district TEA accountability ratings
2011: Recognized
2010: Recognized
2009: Recognized
2008: Academically Acceptable
2007: Academically Acceptable
2006: Academically Acceptable
2005: Academically Acceptable
2004: Academically Acceptable

Schools

In the 2011-2012 school year, the district had students in five schools.
Regular instructional
Anahuac High School (Grades 9-12)
Anahuac Middle School (Grades 6-8)
Anahuac Elementary School (Grades PK-5)
Alternative instructional
Adaptive Behavior Unit (Grades 1-12)
Hardin/Chambers Center (DAEP Grades 6-12)

Special programs

Athletics
Anahuac High School participates in the boys sports of baseball, basketball, football, powerlifting, track and soccer. The school participates in the girls sports of basketball, softball, and volleyball. For the 2012 through 2014 school years, Anahuac High School will play football in UIL Class 2A Division I.

See also

List of school districts in Texas
List of high schools in Texas

References

External links
 

School districts in Chambers County, Texas